The Sindicato Español Universitario ("Spanish University Union"; SEU) was a corporatist students' union in Spain, created in the 1930s during the Second Spanish Republic, by the Falange Española (later the Falange Española de las JONS) under the leadership of José Antonio Primo de Rivera. The SEU was inspired by students' unions linked to contemporary fascist parties of Italy and Romania.

It was founded with the aim of crushing the then prevalent  ("Academic University Federation"; FUE) and to introduce Falangist propaganda in the university circles.

At the end of the Spanish Civil War in 1939, the SEU was proclaimed the sole legal student organization by the Francoist regime, now as part of the FET y de las JONS (following the 1937 Unification Decree). Although all students were formally required to be members, it never succeeded in gaining a foothold in universities across the country, and by the mid-1960s democratically oriented students began to autonomously organize themselves in clandestine organizations, particularly in Catalonia.

After 1965, the SEU disappeared from university life and was reorganized in 1977 within the Falangist party. The later splits gave rise to various regroupings which still claimed the historical union.

References

Bibliography

Falangism
20th century in Spain
Fascism in Spain
National syndicalism
Francoist Spain
Student political organizations
Student organisations in Spain
Student wings of political parties in Spain
Students' unions
Trade unions in Spain
Organisations of the Spanish Civil War
FET y de las JONS